The Mars Telecommunications Orbiter (MTO) was a cancelled Mars mission that was originally intended to launch in 2009 and would have established an Interplanetary Internet between Earth and Mars. The spacecraft would have arrived in a high orbit above Mars in 2010 and relayed data packets to Earth from a variety of Mars landers, rovers and orbiters for as long as ten years, at an extremely high data rate. Such a dedicated communications satellite was thought to be necessary due to the vast quantity of scientific information to be sent to Earth by landers such as the Mars Science Laboratory.

On July 21, 2005, it was announced that MTO had been canceled due to the need to support other short-term goals, including a Hubble servicing mission, Mars Exploration Rover extended mission operations, launch Mars Science Laboratory in 2009, and to prevent Earth science mission Glory from being cancelled.

Data transfer technology 
The Mars Telecommunications Orbiter would have carried Mars Laser Communication Demonstration to demonstrate laser communication in space (optical communications), instead of usual radiowaves. "Lasercom sends information using beams of light and optical elements, such as telescopes and optical amplifiers, rather than RF signals, amplifiers, and antennas."

MTO would have had two 15 W X-band radio transmitters, and two Ka-band radio transmitters (35 W operational, and 100 W experimental).

Proposed successors 
After the cancellation, a broader mission was proposed as the Mars Science and Telecommunications Orbiter. However, this mission was soon criticized as lacking well-defined parameters and objectives. Another mission has since been proposed as the 2013 Mars Science Orbiter.

The communications capability provided by the Mars Reconnaissance Orbiter and Mars Express science missions has proven substantial, demonstrating that dedicated relay satellites may be unnecessary in the near future. The two newest science orbiters are the MAVEN, which arrived at Mars on September 21, 2014 with an Electra transceiver; and the 2016 European ExoMars Trace Gas Orbiter, that also carries an Electra UHF band transceiver. But both follow science orbits not designed for relay communications. 

Around 2014, a concern in NASA is that the currently used relay satellite, Mars Odyssey, may fail, resulting in the need to press MAVEN science orbiter into use as the backup telecommunications relay, but the highly elliptical orbit of MAVEN will limit its usefulness as a relay for operating landers on the surface.

As of 2018, the proposed Next Mars Orbiter (NeMO) is to be a dedicated telecommunications orbiter with a robust science package, tentatively planned for the late 2020s. It is anticipated to employ a laser communication subsystem, that was successfully tested aboard the Lunar Atmosphere and Dust Environment Explorer mission in 2013.

See also
 Laser space communication
 
  (OPALS)

References

Missions to Mars
Proposed NASA space probes
Cancelled spacecraft
Laser communication in space